Chynoweth is a name of Cornish origin meaning "new house" (Chy nowydh) in the Cornish language. It may refer to:

Places 
 Chynoweth, Cornwall, a village in St Hilary parish in Cornwall, UK

People

Real 
 Bob Chynoweth (born 1941), Australian politician
 Dean Chynoweth (born 1968), Canadian ice hockey player
 Ed Chynoweth (1941–2008), Canadian ice hockey team owner
 Jade Chynoweth (born 1998), American actress and dancer

Fictional 
 Elizabeth Chynoweth and the Chynoweth family, characters in the Poldark series by Winston Graham

See also

 Chenoweth
 Ed Chynoweth Cup
 Ed Chynoweth Trophy
 Ohlone-Chynoweth (VTA)
 Ohlone-Chynoweth - Almaden (VTA)

Cornish-language surnames